Olexandrella serotina is a species of beetle in the family Cerambycidae. It was described by Zajciw in 1959.

References

Dodecosini
Beetles described in 1959